Contemporary classical music is classical music composed close to the present day.  At the beginning of the 21st century, it commonly referred to the post-1945 modern forms of post-tonal music after the death of Anton Webern, and included serial music, electronic music, experimental music, and minimalist music. Newer forms of music include spectral music, and post-minimalism.

History

Background 

At the beginning of the twentieth century, composers of classical music were experimenting with an increasingly dissonant pitch language, which sometimes yielded atonal pieces. Following World War I, as a backlash against what they saw as the increasingly exaggerated gestures and formlessness of late Romanticism, certain composers adopted a neoclassic style, which sought to recapture the balanced forms and clearly perceptible thematic processes of earlier styles (see also New Objectivity and Social Realism). After World War II, modernist composers sought to achieve greater levels of control in their composition process (e.g., through the use of the twelve-tone technique and later total serialism). At the same time, conversely, composers also experimented with means of abdicating control, exploring indeterminacy or aleatoric processes in smaller or larger degrees. Technological advances led to the birth of electronic music. Experimentation with tape loops and repetitive textures contributed to the advent of minimalism. Still other composers started exploring the theatrical potential of the musical performance (performance art, mixed media, fluxus). New works of contemporary classical music continue to be created. Each year, the Boston Conservatory at Berklee presents 700 performances. New works from contemporary classical music program students comprise roughly 150 of these performances.

1945–75 

To some extent, European and the US traditions diverged after World War II. Among the most influential composers in Europe were Pierre Boulez, Luigi Nono, and Karlheinz Stockhausen. The first and last were both pupils of Olivier Messiaen. An important aesthetic philosophy as well as a group of compositional techniques at this time was serialism (also called "through-ordered music", "'total' music" or "total tone ordering"), which took as its starting point the compositions of Arnold Schoenberg and Anton Webern (but was opposed to traditional twelve-tone music), and was also closely related to Le Corbusier's idea of the modulor. However, some more traditionally based composers such as Dmitri Shostakovich and Benjamin Britten maintained a tonal style of composition despite the prominent serialist movement.

In America, composers like Milton Babbitt, John Cage, Elliott Carter, Henry Cowell, Philip Glass, Steve Reich, George Rochberg, and Roger Sessions, formed their own ideas. Some of these composers (Cage, Cowell, Glass, Reich) represented a new methodology of experimental music, which began to question fundamental notions of music such as notation, performance, duration, and repetition, while others (Babbitt, Rochberg, Sessions) fashioned their own extensions of the twelve-tone serialism of Schoenberg.

Movements

Neoromanticism 

The vocabulary of extended tonality, which flourished in the late 19th and very early 20th centuries, continues to be used by contemporary composers.  It has never been considered shocking or controversial in the larger musical world—as has been demonstrated statistically for the United States, at least, where "most composers continued working in what has remained throughout this century the mainstream of tonal-oriented composition".

High modernism 

Serialism is one of the most important post-war movements among the high modernist schools. Serialism, more specifically named "integral" or "compound" serialism, was led by composers such as Pierre Boulez, Bruno Maderna, Luigi Nono, and Karlheinz Stockhausen in Europe, and by Milton Babbitt, Donald Martino, Mario Davidovsky, and Charles Wuorinen in the United States. Some of their compositions use an ordered set or several such sets, which may be the basis for the whole composition, while others use "unordered" sets. The term is also often used for dodecaphony, or twelve-tone technique, which is alternatively regarded as the model for integral serialism.

Despite its decline in the last third of the 20th century, there remained at the end of the century an active core of composers who continued to advance the ideas and forms of high modernism.  Those no longer living included Pierre Boulez, Pauline Oliveros, Toru Takemitsu,  Jacob Druckman,  George Perle, Ralph Shapey. Franco Donatoni,  Jonathan Harvey, Erkki Salmenhaara, and Henrik Otto Donner, Those still living today include Magnus Lindberg, George Benjamin, Brian Ferneyhough, Wolfgang Rihm, Richard Wernick, Richard Wilson, and James MacMillan.

Electronic music

Computer music 

Between 1975 and 1990, a shift in the paradigm of computer technology had taken place, making electronic music systems affordable and widely accessible. The personal computer had become an essential component of the electronic musician's equipment, superseding analog synthesizers and fulfilling the traditional functions of composition and scoring, synthesis and sound processing, sampling of audio input, and control over external equipment.

Music theatre

Spectral music

Polystylism (eclecticism) 

Some authors equate polystylism with eclecticism, while others make a sharp distinction.

Post-modernism

Minimalism and post-minimalism

Historicism 
Musical historicism—the use of historical materials, structures, styles, techniques, media, conceptual content, etc., whether by a single composer or those associated with a particular school, movement, or period—is evident to varying degrees in minimalism, post-minimalism, world-music, and other genres in which tonal traditions have been sustained or have undergone a significant revival in recent decades. Some post-minimalist works employ medieval and other genres associated with early music, such as the "Oi me lasso" and other laude of Gavin Bryars.

The historicist movement is closely related to the emergence of musicology and the early music revival. A number of historicist composers have been influenced by their intimate familiarity with the instrumental practices of earlier periods (Hendrik Bouman, Grant Colburn, Michael Talbot, Paulo Galvão, Roman Turovsky-Savchuk). The musical historicism movement has also been stimulated by the formation of such international organizations as the Delian Society and Vox Saeculorum.

Art rock influence 
Some composers have emerged since the 1980s who are influenced by art rock, for example, Rhys Chatham.

New Simplicity

New Complexity 
New Complexity is a current within today's European contemporary avant-garde music scene, named in reaction to the New Simplicity.  Amongst the candidates suggested for having coined the term are the composer Nigel Osborne, the Belgian musicologist Harry Halbreich, and the British/Australian musicologist Richard Toop, who gave currency to the concept of a movement with his article "Four Facets of the New Complexity".

Though often atonal, highly abstract, and dissonant in sound, the "New Complexity" is most readily characterized by the use of techniques which require complex musical notation. This includes extended techniques, microtonality, odd tunings, highly disjunct melodic contour, innovative timbres, complex polyrhythms, unconventional instrumentations, abrupt changes in loudness and intensity, and so on. The diverse group of composers writing in this style includes Richard Barrett, Brian Ferneyhough, Claus-Steffen Mahnkopf, James Dillon, Michael Finnissy, James Erber, and Roger Redgate.

Developments by medium

Opera 

Notable composers of operas since 1975 include:

Michel van der Aa
Mark Adamo
John Adams
Thomas Adès
Miguel del Águila
Bruce Adolphe
Robert Ashley
Lera Auerbach
Gerald Barry
George Benjamin
Tim Benjamin
Luciano Berio
Michael Berkeley
Oscar Bianchi
Harrison Birtwistle
Antonio Braga
Rudolf Brucci
John Cage
Roberto Carnevale
Elliott Carter
Daniel Catán
Tom Cipullo
Azio Corghi
Michael Daugherty
Peter Maxwell Davies
Julius Eastman
John Eaton
Oscar Edelstein
Marios Joannou Elia
Péter Eötvös
Mohammed Fairouz
Brian Ferneyhough
Lorenzo Ferrero
Juan Carlos Figueiras
Luca Francesconi
Philip Glass
Elliot Goldenthal
Ricky Ian Gordon
Daron Hagen
Hans Werner Henze
Bern Herbolsheimer
York Höller
Giselher Klebe
Helmut Lachenmann
Lori Laitman
André Laporte
György Ligeti
Liza Lim
David T. Little
Luca Lombardi
Missy Mazzoli
Richard Meale
Olivier Messiaen
Robert Moran
Nico Muhly
Olga Neuwirth
Luigi Nono
Per Nørgård
Michael Nyman
Michael Obst
Jocy de Oliveira
Marcus Paus
Henri Pousseur
Kevin Puts
Einojuhani Rautavaara
Kaija Saariaho
Aulis Sallinen
Carol Sams
David Sawer
Howard Shore
Louis Siciliano
Karlheinz Stockhausen
Somtow Sucharitkul
Josef Tal
Stefano Vagnini
Claude Vivier
Judith Weir

Cinema and television 
Notable composers of post-1945 classical film and television scores include:

Michael Abels
Elmer Bernstein
Howard Blake
Bruce Broughton
Aaron Copland
John Debney
Alexandre Desplat
Ramin Djawadi
Danny Elfman
Brad Fiedel
Robert Folk
Benjamin Frankel
Michael Giacchino
Ernest Gold
Elliot Goldenthal
Jerry Goldsmith
Bernard Herrmann
Joe Hisaishi
James Horner
Akira Ifukube
Shin'ichirō Ikebe
Henry Jackman
Steve Jablonsky
Michael Kamen
Aram Khachaturian
Wojciech Kilar
Ennio Morricone
David Newman
Alex North
John Powell
Leonard Rosenman
Nino Rota
Miklós Rózsa
Alfred Schnittke
Howard Shore
Dmitri Shostakovich
Alan Silvestri
Tōru Takemitsu
Dimitri Tiomkin
Brian Tyler
Ralph Vaughan Williams
William Walton
Franz Waxman
John Williams
Hans Zimmer

Contemporary classical music originally written for the concert hall can also be heard on the music track of some films, such as Stanley Kubrick's 2001: A Space Odyssey (1968) and Eyes Wide Shut (1999), both of which used concert music by György Ligeti, and also in Kubrick's The Shining (1980) which used music by both Ligeti and Krzysztof Penderecki. Jean-Luc Godard, in La Chinoise (1967), Nicolas Roeg in Walkabout (1971), and the Brothers Quay in In Absentia (2000) used music by Karlheinz Stockhausen.

Chamber 
Some notable works for chamber orchestra:
 Composition for Twelve Instruments (1948, rev. 1954) – Milton Babbitt
 Concerto for seven wind instruments, timpani, percussion, and string orchestra (1949) – Frank Martin
 Drei Lieder (1950) – Karlheinz Stockhausen
 Nummer 2 (1951) – Karel Goeyvaerts
 Oiseaux exotiques (1956) – Olivier Messiaen
 Requiem for strings (1957) – Tōru Takemitsu
 Threnody to the Victims of Hiroshima (1960) – Krzysztof Penderecki
 Double Concerto for harpsichord and piano with two chamber orchestras (1961) – Elliott Carter
 Stop (1965) – Karlheinz Stockhausen
 Fantasia for Strings (1966) – Hans Werner Henze
 Ojikawa (1968) – Claude Vivier
 Concerto for clarinet and vibraphone with six instrumental formations (1968) – Jean Barraqué
 Ramifications (1968–69) – György Ligeti
 Compases para preguntas ensimismadas (1970) – Hans Werner Henze
 Recital I (for Cathy) (1972) – Luciano Berio
 Trois airs pour un opéra imaginaire (1982) – Claude Vivier
 Guitar Concerto No. 2 for guitar and strings (1985) – Alan Hovhaness
 Invocation for Oboe and Guitar (1993) – Apostolos Paraskevas
 Kol-Od (1996) – Luciano Berio
 Asko Concerto (2000) – Elliott Carter
 Dialogues for piano and chamber orchestra (2003) – Elliott Carter
 Fünf Sternzeichen (2004) – Karlheinz Stockhausen
 Fünf weitere Sternzeichen (2007) – Karlheinz Stockhausen
 Diário das Narrativas Fantásticas (2019) – Caio Facó

Concert bands (wind ensembles) 

In recent years, many composers have composed for concert bands (also called wind ensembles). Notable composers include: 

James Barnes
Leslie Bassett 
David Bedford 
Richard Rodney Bennett
Warren Benson
Steven Bryant
Daniel Bukvich
Mark Camphouse
Michael Colgrass
John Corigliano 
Michael Daugherty
David Del Tredici
Thomas C. Duffy 
Eric Ewazen 
Aldo Rafael Forte
Michael Gandolfi 
David Gillingham 
Julie Giroux
Peter Graham 
Donald Grantham 
Edward Gregson 
John Harbison 
Samuel Hazo 
Kenneth Hesketh
Karel Husa 
Yasuhide Ito
Scott Lindroth
Scott McAllister 
W. Francis McBeth 
James MacMillan 
Cindy McTee 
David Maslanka
Nicholas Maw
John Mackey 
Johan de Meij
Olivier Messiaen
Lior Navok
Ron Nelson
Carter Pann
Vincent Persichetti
 
Alfred Reed
Steven Reineke

Gunther Schuller 
Joseph Schwantner
Robert W. Smith
Philip Sparke
Jack Stamp 
Karlheinz Stockhausen
Steven Stucky
Frank Ticheli
Michael Tippett
Jan Van der Roost
Dan Welcher 
Eric Whitacre
Dana Wilson
Guy Woolfenden
Charles Rochester Young

Festivals 

The following is an incomplete list of contemporary-music festivals:
 Ars Musica, Brussels, Belgium
 Bang on a Can Marathon
 Big Ears Festival
 Darmstädter Ferienkurse
 Donaueschingen Festival
  in Caracas, Venezuela
 Gaudeamus Foundation Music Week in Amsterdam
 Huddersfield Contemporary Music Festival
 Lucerne Festival in Switzerland
 MATA Festival in New York
 Music Biennale Zagreb
 Musica (French music festival)
 New Music Gathering
 November Music in 's Hertogenbosch (the Netherlands) 
 Other Minds in San Francisco
 Peninsula Arts Contemporary Music Festival
 Warsaw Autumn in Poland
 George Enescu Festival in Romania
 Cabrillo Festival of Contemporary Music in Santa Cruz, California

See also
 List of contemporary classical ensembles

Notes

Sources 

 
 
 
 
 
 
 
 
 
 
 
 
 
  (Subscription access)

Further reading 

 Cardoso-Firmo, Ana. 2011. "La Cantatrice Chauve de Jean-Philippe Calvin". In Dramaturgies de l'Absurde en France et au Portugal, pp. 199–203. Paris: Université de Paris 8.
 Chute, James. 2001. "Torke, Michael." The New Grove Dictionary of Music and Musicians, edited by Stanley Sadie and John Tyrrell. London: Macmillan.
 Cross, Jonathan. 2001. "Turnage, Mark-Anthony". The New Grove Dictionary of Music and Musicians, second edition, edited by Stanley Sadie and John Tyrrell. London: Macmillan.
 Danuser, Hermann. 1984. Die Musik des 20. Jahrhunderts: mit 108 Notenbeispielen, 130 Abbildungen und 2 Farbtafeln. Neues Handbuch der Musikwissenschaft 7. Laaber: Laaber-Verlag. 
 . 1998. Moderne Musik Nach 1945. Munich: Piper Verlag.  (pbk.)
 Du Noyer, Paul (ed.) (2003), "Contemporary" in The Illustrated Encyclopedia of Music. London: Flame Tree, 
 Duckworth, William. 1995. Talking Music: Conversations with John Cage, Philip Glass, Laurie Anderson, and Five Generations of American Experimental Composers. New York: Schirmer Books; London: Prentice-Hall International.  Reprinted 1999, New York: Da Capo Press. 
 Gann, Kyle. 1997. American Music in the Twentieth Century. New York: Schirmer Books; London: Prentice Hall International. Belmont, CA: Wadsworth/Thomson Learning .
 Griffiths, Paul. 1995. Modern Music And After: Directions Since 1945. Oxford and New York: Oxford University Press.  (cloth)  (pbk.) Rev. ed. of: Modern Music: The Avant Garde Since 1945 (1981)
 Morgan, Robert P. 1991. Twentieth-century Music: A History of Musical Style in Modern Europe and America. New York: Norton. 
 New Music: Music since 1950. 1978. Vienna: Universal Edition. N.B.: Biography-bibliography dictionary. Without ISBN
 Nyman, Michael. 1999. Experimental Music: Cage and Beyond. Second edition. Music in the 20th century. Cambridge University Press.   (pbk.)
 Schwartz, Elliott, and Barney Childs (eds.), with Jim Fox. 1998. Contemporary Composers on Contemporary Music. Expanded edition. New York: Da Capo Press. 
 Smith Brindle, Reginald. 1987. The New Music: The Avant-Garde since 1945. Oxford and New York: Oxford University Press.  (cloth)  (pbk.)
 Whittall, Arnold. 1999. Musical Composition in the Twentieth Century. New York: Oxford University Press.  (cloth)  (pbk.)
 Whittall, Arnold. 2003. Exploring Twentieth-Century Music: Tradition and Innovation. Cambridge and New York: Cambridge University Press.  (cloth)  (pbk)

External links 

 Sussurro – Contemporary Brazilian music
 Gateway to contemporary music resources in France
 highSCORE Festival
 "Guide to contemporary music", Bachtrack